Sebastian Prodanovich also misspelled Sebastian Brodanovich von Usiza (Serbian Cyrillic: Себастијан Продановић; c. 1755 – 15 September 1822) was an Austrian General Major and Field Marshal Lieutenant of Serbian origin.

He was born in Mitrovic in Syrmia during the time of the Habsburg monarchy around 1755. In the last stages of the Italian campaign, Avantgarde General Major Sebastian Prodanovich led No. 1959 II Battalion Grenz Infantry Regiment of Banat (I Battalion 13th Grenz regiment) and No. 837 V Battalion Banater Grenz Regiment with Austrian Avantgarde Major General Vukassovich's brigade against the forces of Napoleon.

He died in Sremska Mitrovica on 15 September 1822.

See also
 Paul Davidovich
 Martin von Dedovich
 Anton Csorich

References 

Major generals
People from Sremska Mitrovica
1750s births
1822 deaths
Year of birth uncertain